Pseudogracilibacillus auburnensis is a Gram-positive, aerobic and endospore-forming bacterium from the genus of Pseudogracilibacillus which has been isolated from the rhizosphere from the corn plant (Zea mays) from Auburn in the United States.

References

 

Bacillaceae
Bacteria described in 2014